The Sokolnicheskaya line (formerly Kirovsko-Frunzenskaya (Line 1; Red Line) is a line of the Moscow Metro. It opened in 1935 and is the oldest in the system. There are currently 26 stations open on the line.

History
As the line was the first formal one in the system, its history of development coincides with the history of the Moscow Metro's first stage altogether. In short it was to cut Moscow on a northeast-southwest axis beginning at the Sokolniki Park and continuing through the Three railway terminals and then past the city centre's main traffic junctions: Red gate junction, Kirovskaya, the Lubyanka and the Manege Squares. From there, a separate branch carried off into the Arbat Street and later Kiyevsky railway station, before it became in 1938 the distinct Arbatsko-Pokrovskaya line and, later, in 1958, the Filyovskaya line. The remaining part of the Frunzenskaya Branch went along the Kremlin's western wall past the Russian State Library to the future site of the Palace of the Soviets on the bank of the Moskva River and terminated near the Gorky Park.

Although Moscow Metro prides itself on the best Stalinist architecture and the earlier Art Deco attempts, the stations of the first stage are very far from those. Instead they have a very classical taste to them, which blends nicely with the neo-classical atmosphere of the mid-1930s. It is also true that the overall construction of these early stations allowed the palaces of the 1940s and 1950s to evolve from them. Most of these stations are now officially listed as architectural heritage.

Further development was seen in the latter half of the 1950s during the construction of the Frunzensky radius. The line extended into the Khamovniki District in 1957 coming up to Luzhniki Stadium and then in 1959 reached the Moscow State University on the Sparrow Hills. This required crossing the Moskva river on a combined auto and Metro bridge including a station on it. However, due to the necessity of reconstruction in 1984, the station was closed, and not reopened until 2002. The Frunzensky radius was completed in 1964 upon the last extension into the new bedroom communities along the Vernadsky Avenue of southwestern Moscow.

At the opposite end, there were two extensions: one in 1965 across the Yauza River (also via an open bridge) to Preobrazhenskaya Square, and another in 1990 into the Bogorodskoye District.

Recent developments and future plans
Presently the line has the oldest structures in operation, and thus several renovations have been carried out systematically. Recent changes include a second entrance to Kropotkinskaya in 1998, major lighting enhancements to Okhotny Ryad and Kropotkinskaya.

In the south, Metro completed an extension of the line from Yugo-Zapadnaya in 2016, adding Troparyovo in December 2014, Rumyantsevo in January 2016, and Salaryevo in February 2016. Metro is an 11.6 km extension to the town of Kommunarka on June 20, 2019, with the construction of four stations: Filatov Lug, Prokshino, Olkhovaya, and Kommunarka. Kommunarka will allow transfers to the Troitskaya line in 2023. The city released initial station designs for Olkhovaya and Kommunarka in December 2017 and set an initial completion date in 2019. A transfer to the Bolshaya Koltsevaya line at Prospekt Vernadskogo opened on 7 December 2021 and a transfer to Sokolniki is planned in 2024, as well as the extension from Kommunarka to Potapovo. An extension from Potapovo to Buninskaya Alleya to transfer to the Butovskaya line is planned after 2023.

Planned extensions in the north are hampered by the position of Cherkizovskaya and Bulvar Rokossovskogo which were built so as to become a part of the projected second ring line that has been in planning since the 1960s. Cherkizovskaya's tunnels have provisions for a second perpendicular station, that would allow the line to continue eastwards to the district of Golyanovo and meet the Arbatsko-Pokrovskaya line at Shchyolkovskaya. Such an extension, however, is not scheduled in the current official development program. The stations of a possible extension to Shchyolkovskaya and Vostochny would be Amurskaya, Shchyolkovskaya, Krasnoyarskaya and Vostochnaya.

Timeline

Name changes

Transfers

Rolling stock
Two depots are assigned to the line, the TCh-1 Severnoye and the TCh-13 Cherkizovo. Starting in 1997 both depots have been upgrading to the new 81-717.5M/714.5M trains (all factory fresh). Currently all carriages of the old Ezh, Ezh-1, Em-508 and Em-509 have been retired.

When the line opened in 1935, trainsets included only four cars. By the middle of the 20th century, trainsets expanded to seven cars. In 2018, the Metro became extending trains of Cherkizovo depot to eight cars. This will add additional capacity to the system of more than 186,000 passengers per day.

Subway car types used on the line over the years:

- Series A, B: 1935 - 1951

- Series V: 1946 - 1958

- Series D: 1956 - 1986

- Series E: 1966 - 2002

- Series Ezh, Em-508 and Em-509: 1970 - 2008

- Series 81-717.5M/714.5M: 1997 - present

- Series 81-717.5A/714.5A: since 2010 (only one train)

- Series 81-765.3/766.3/767.3: 2019 (only one train)

- Series 81-765.4/766.4/767.4: 2019 - present

- Series 81-765/766/767: 2020 - present 

- Series 81-740.1/741.1: 2020 - present

References

External links

  illustrated contemporary description of the Moscow underground

Moscow Metro lines
Railway lines opened in 1935